James Lawrence Wiechers (August 7, 1944 – October 15, 2018) was an American professional golfer who played on the PGA Tour in the 1960s and 1970s.

Wiechers was born in Oakland, California. He won the 1962 U.S. Junior Amateur while in high school. He then attended Santa Clara University and was a member of the golf team, winning first-team All-American honors in 1965. He collected many honors during his amateur career including Golf Digests Number One U.S. Amateur award in 1966. Wiechers turned professional and joined the PGA Tour in 1966.

Wiechers played on the PGA Tour from 1966 to 1979. His best years were in the late 1960s through the mid-1970s when he finished on the top-60 money list five times. He won one PGA Tour event during his career: the 1969 West End Classic.

After leaving the tour, Wiechers first began working in California's Napa Valley wine industry in the 1980s. Then he returned to golf in the 1990s, first as head instructor at McCaffrey's Golf School in San Francisco, then as a teaching pro at Chardonnay Golf Club for 19 years, and finally at Eagle Vines Golf Club. He also coached the men's and women's golf teams at Napa Valley College.

Wiechers died on October 15, 2018, at Queen of the Valley Medical Center in Napa, California following a four-month-long illness.

Amateur wins
1962 U.S. Junior Amateur
1964 Western Junior
1966 Western Amateur, Trans-Mississippi Amateur

Professional wins (1)
PGA Tour wins (1)PGA Tour playoff record (0–1)'

See also
1966 PGA Tour Qualifying School graduates

References

External links

American male golfers
Santa Clara Broncos men's golfers
PGA Tour golfers
College golf coaches in the United States
Golfers from California
Napa Valley College
Sportspeople from Oakland, California
People from Atherton, California
People from Napa, California
1944 births
2018 deaths